The women's 3000 metres steeplechase event at the 2016 IAAF World U20 Championships was held at Zdzisław Krzyszkowiak Stadium on 19 and 22 July.

Medalists

Records

Results

Heats
Qualification: First 5 of each heat (Q) and the 5 fastest times (q) qualified for the final.

Final

References

3000 metres steeplechase
Steeplechase at the World Athletics U20 Championships